Margaret Anne Doody (born September 21, 1939) is a Canadian author of historical detective fiction and feminist literary critic. She is professor of literature at the University of Notre Dame, helped found the PhD in Literature Program at Notre Dame, and served as its director from 2001 to 2007.

Academic career
Doody completed her doctorate at the University of Oxford in 1968.  She then taught at the University of Wales from 1969 to 1976, after which she taught at Princeton University.

According to the New York Times, Doody, along with Valerie Smith, Emory Elliott, and Sandra Gilbert, resigned from Princeton in 1989.  The reports suggest that the four were unhappy with the leniency shown to Thomas McFarland after he was accused of sexual misconduct.  McFarland was initially put on a one-year suspension, but eventually took early retirement after these resignations and threats of student boycotts.

Subsequently, she taught at Vanderbilt University and the University of Notre Dame.

Fiction writing
Although historical detective stories are now a flourishing genre, with Steven Saylor and Lindsey Davis being particularly prominent in the field of detective stories set in classical antiquity, back in 1978, when Aristotle Detective was first published, Doody was something of a pioneer in the genre. Recently she has added four more to the series featuring Aristotle as a 4th-century B.C. detective. There is also a novella, Anello di bronzo (Ring of Bronze), currently available only in Italian.

Doody's Aristotle books are published in Italy by Sellerio editore, which also produced a translation of The Alchemists. In France the mystery novels are published by 10/18. They are also available in Spanish, Portuguese and Greek; individual novels have recently appeared in Polish and Russian. The first Aristotle novel has also been published in German.

Bibliography

The Aristotle series
Aristotle Detective (1978)
Aristotle and Poetic Justice (2000)
Aristotle and the Mystery of Life (also published as Aristotle and the Secrets of Life) (2002)
Aristotle and the Ring of Bronze (2003)
Poison in Athens (2004)
Mysteries of Eleusis (2005)
Aristotle and the Egyptian Murders (2010)
A cloudy day in Babylon (2013)

Short story of the Aristotle series 
Aristotle and the Fatal Javelin (1980)

Other novels
The Alchemists (1980)

Academic books
A Natural Passion: A Study of the Novels of Samuel Richardson (1974)
The Daring Muse: Augustan Poetry Reconsidered (1985) 
Frances Burney: The Life in the Works  (1996)
The True Story of the Novel (1996)
Tropic of Venice (2007)
Jane Austen's Names: Riddles, Persons, Places (2015)

References 
 Jacques Baudou et Jean-Jacques Schleret, Le Vrai visage du masque, Paris, Futuropolis, 1984, p. 166.
 Claude Mesplède, Dictionnaire des littératures policières, volume 1, Nantes, Éditions Joseph K, coll. Temps noir, 2007, p. 608-609.

Notes

External links
Interview with Margaret Doody, copy archived March 7, 2008

1939 births
Canadian historical novelists
Canadian mystery writers
Living people
University of Notre Dame faculty
Women mystery writers
Writers from Saint John, New Brunswick
Writers of historical fiction set in antiquity
Writers of historical mysteries
Canadian women novelists
Women historical novelists
Vanderbilt University faculty